In mathematics, the (linear) Peetre theorem, named after Jaak Peetre, is a result of functional analysis that gives a characterisation of differential operators in terms of their effect on generalized function spaces, and without mentioning differentiation in explicit terms.  The Peetre theorem is an example of a finite order theorem in which a function or a functor, defined in a very general way, can in fact be shown to be a polynomial because of some extraneous condition or symmetry imposed upon it.

This article treats two forms of the Peetre theorem.  The first is the original version which, although quite useful in its own right, is actually too general for most applications.

The original Peetre theorem 
Let M be a smooth manifold and let E and F be two vector bundles on M.  Let

be the spaces of smooth sections of E and F.  An operator

is a morphism of sheaves which is linear on sections such that the support of D is non-increasing: supp Ds ⊆ supp s for every smooth section s of E.   The original Peetre theorem asserts that, for every point p in M, there is a neighborhood U of p and an integer k (depending on U) such that D is a differential operator of order k over U.  This means that D factors through a linear mapping iD from the k-jet of sections of E into the space of smooth sections of F:

where

is the k-jet operator and

is a linear mapping of vector bundles.

Proof 
The problem is invariant under local diffeomorphism, so it is sufficient to prove it when M is an open set in Rn and E and F are trivial bundles.  At this point, it relies primarily on two lemmas:
Lemma 1.  If the hypotheses of the theorem are satisfied, then for every x∈M and C > 0, there exists a neighborhood V of x and a positive integer k such that for any y∈V\{x} and for any section s of E whose k-jet  vanishes at y (jks(y)=0), we have |Ds(y)|<C.
Lemma 2.  The first lemma is sufficient to prove the theorem.

We begin with the proof of Lemma 1.

Suppose the lemma is false.  Then there is a sequence xk tending to x, and a sequence of very disjoint balls Bk around the xk (meaning that the geodesic distance between any two such balls is non-zero), and sections sk of E over each Bk such that jksk(xk)=0 but |Dsk(xk)|≥C>0.

Let ρ(x) denote a standard bump function for the unit ball at the origin: a smooth real-valued function which is equal to 1 on B1/2(0), which vanishes to infinite order on the boundary of the unit ball.

Consider every other section s2k.  At x2k, these satisfy 
j2ks2k(x2k)=0.
Suppose that 2k is given.  Then, since these functions are smooth and each satisfy j2k(s2k)(x2k)=0, it is possible to specify a smaller ball B′δ(x2k) such that the higher order derivatives obey the following estimate:

where

Now

is a standard bump function supported in B′δ(x2k), and the derivative of the product s2kρ2k is bounded in such a way that

As a result, because the following series and all of the partial sums of its derivatives converge uniformly
 
q(y) is a smooth function on all of V.

We now observe that since s2k and 2ks2k are equal in a neighborhood of x2k,

So by continuity |Dq(x)|≥ C>0.  On the other hand, 

since Dq(x2k+1)=0 because q is identically zero in B2k+1 and D is support non-increasing.  So Dq(x)=0.  This is a contradiction.

We now prove Lemma 2.

First, let us dispense with the constant C from the first lemma.  We show that, under the same hypotheses as Lemma 1, |Ds(y)|=0.  Pick a y in V\{x} so that jks(y)=0 but |Ds(y)|=g>0.  Rescale s by a factor of 2C/g.  Then if g is non-zero, by the linearity of D, |Ds(y)|=2C>C, which is impossible by Lemma 1.  This proves the theorem in the punctured neighborhood V\{x}.

Now, we must continue the differential operator to the central point x in the punctured neighborhood.  D is a linear differential operator with smooth coefficients.  Furthermore, it sends germs of smooth functions to germs of smooth functions at x as well.  Thus the coefficients of D are also smooth at x.

A specialized application 
Let M be a compact smooth manifold (possibly with boundary), and E and F be finite dimensional vector bundles on M.  Let

be the collection of smooth sections of E.  An operator

is a smooth function (of Fréchet manifolds) which is linear on the fibres and respects the base point on M:

The Peetre theorem asserts that for each operator D, there exists an integer k such that D is a differential operator of order k.   Specifically, we can decompose

where  is a mapping from the jets of sections of E to the bundle F.  See also intrinsic differential operators.

Example: Laplacian 
Consider the following operator:

This is in fact the Laplacian. We show will show  is a differential operator by Peetre's theorem.

The technical proof goes as follows.

As a sheaf,  is the set of smooth functions on the open set  and restriction is function restriction.

It is easy to check that  is linear: 

 and 

Finally, we check that  is local in the sense that .

Therefore, .

So by Peetre's theorem,  is a differential operator.

References 

 Peetre, J., Une caractérisation abstraite des opérateurs différentiels, Math. Scand. 7 (1959), 211-218.
 Peetre, J., Rectification à l'article Une caractérisation abstraite des opérateurs différentiels, Math. Scand. 8 (1960), 116-120.
 Terng, C.L., Natural vector bundles and natural differential operators, Am. J. Math. 100 (1978), 775-828.

Articles containing proofs
Differential operators
Theorems in functional analysis